Andrew III of Vitré (c. 1200 † 8 February 1250 at the Battle of Al Mansurah, in Egypt) was Baron of Vitré and Aubigné from 1211 to 1250.

Life 
Andrew III was the eldest son of Andrew II, Baron of Vitré, and his third wife Eustacie of Rays, daughter of Harscoët of Rays.

He is said to have founded the old convent of the Jacobins in Nantes in 1228

In c. 1230 he rebuilt the Château de Vitré and surrounded it with fortifications that encompassed the Vieil-Bourg and the church of Notre-Dame of Vitré. He also founded the castle of Chevré, a lordship belonging to the Barony of Vitré. He took part in the Seventh Crusade in 1248 with Louis IX of France and died at the Battle of Al Mansurah.

In his last will and testament dated 1248, Andrew of Vitré gave his wife le chastel de Chasteillon, le moulin de l'estangs doud. lieu et Vendelays o touz ses appartenances (the castle of Chasteillon, the mill by the pond of the aforementioned place and Vendelays and all its dependencies). One of the executors wasGuillaume Merlin, dean of Mayenne.

Marriages and issue 
Andrew III married twice.

He married firstly in 1212 Catherine of Thouars Lady of Aubigné, daughter of Constance, Duchess of Brittany, and Guy of Thouars. They had:
 Philippa, who married Guy VII, Lord of Laval. She succeeded her younger brother and brought the Barony of Vitré into the House of Laval;
 Eustacie, who married Geoffrey I Botherel, Lord of Quintin;
 Alix, who married Fulk III of Mathefelon (c. 1200 † c. 1269), Lord of Azé.

He married secondly around January 1240 Thomasse of La Guerche, Lady of Pouancé and Mareuil. They had:
 Joan;
 Philippa [II] nun at the Abbey of Longchamp, who received lands in Normandy;
 Margaret, who married Aimery of Argenton and also received lands in Normandy as her dowry;
 Aliette, who married William of Villiers;
 Eustacie [II], Lady if Les Huguetières, who married Oliver I of Machecoul around 1268;
 Andrew IV (c. 1247/48 † 15 March 1251).

See also 
 Seventh Crusade
 Château de Vitré

References

External links 
   Medlands website, André III de Vitré

Sources 
 Mairie of Vitré
 Amédée Guillotin de Corson  Les grandes seigneuries de Haute-Bretagne II, 2 Volumes 1897-1899, new edition Le Livre d'Histoire, Paris (1999)
 Frédéric Morvan la Chevalerie de Bretagne et la formation de l'armée ducale 1260-1341 Presses Universitaires de Rennes, Rennes 2009, « Généalogie n°39 : les seigneurs de Vitré (Montmorency-Laval) ».

1250 deaths
13th-century French nobility
Seventh Crusade
Barony of Vitré